The pygmy mammoth or Channel Islands mammoth (Mammuthus exilis) is an extinct species of dwarf elephant descended from the Columbian mammoth (M. columbi) of mainland North America. This species became extinct during the Quaternary extinction event in which many megafauna species became extinct due to changing conditions to which the species could not adapt.

Discovery

Mammoth remains have been known on the northern Channel Islands of California since 1856. They were first reported in scientific literature in 1873.

In 1994 the National Park Service called in scientists to inspect an uncovered, unidentified skeleton found on the northeast coast of Santa Rosa Island. They found bones of the axial skeleton of a large land vertebrate and decided to excavate and dig up the skeleton. They recovered 90% of a mature male pygmy mammoth's skeleton. The mammoth was about 50 years old when it died. The small bones were preserved in life position, which represented that it had died where it was found rather than being scattered around the island. The bones were returned to the Santa Barbara Museum of Natural History.
After the discovery of the skeleton, a pedestrian survey of the island began. This resulted in the discovery of 160 new locations of mammoth remains, the vast majority being found on Santa Rosa Island.
This was the first discovery of a nearly complete specimen of the pygmy mammoth. Fortunately, the skeleton was only missing a foot, a tusk, and a couple of vertebrae. The remains were covered by a sand dune, which prevented the bones from scattering and kept them intact.

Habitat 

Remains of M. exilis have been discovered on three of the northern Channel Islands of California since 1856: Santa Cruz, Santa Rosa, and San Miguel, which together with Anacapa were the highest portions of the now mostly submerged superisland of Santa Rosae. The late Pleistocene elephant appears to have survived on the islands until the arrival of the humans associated with Arlington Springs Man around 13,000 years ago and the last known mammoth occurrence was 13–12.9 thousand years ago which predates the later Chumash people's arrival during the early Holocene, between 10,800 and 11,300 years ago. Radiocarbon dating indicates M. exilis existed on the island for at least 47,000 years prior (which is the approximate limit of the dating method).

As the population of mammoths increased, the lack of large predators such as the dire wolf, Smilodon and the American lion and the loss of habitat caused by the rise of sea levels at the end of the ice age as Santa Rosae split into four islands favored smaller animals. Because of this, the pygmy mammoths began evolving through generations as a survival mechanism to stay alive on the ever-shrinking Santa Rosa Island; their body size became smaller because it required less food and resources to remain energized and alive. After this evolutionary period, the mammoth had become a distinct species, the pygmy mammoth.

M. exilis should not be confused with the mammoths of Wrangel Island or Saint Paul Island, which were small races of the woolly mammoth (M. primigenius) and which died out around 1700 BC and 4000 BC, respectively.

The pygmy mammoth was able to thrive in all of the many different ecosystems found on Santa Rosae, such as high elevation plateaus, to dune, grassland, riparian and steppe-tundra ecosystems. Their fossils are found in the Channel Islands and in the California Channel. The evidence of their habituation in all of those diverse dwellings is revealed by the pollen and plant pieces found in sediments and in dung. In addition, each habitat has a specific isotope mark from the unique types of soil, plants and water. These mammoths sometimes modified their habitats, specifically in Channel Islands, where they created more spacious grassland in result of their roaming.

Evolution

Land bridges were once theorized to have connected the northern Channel Islands to the mainland, because it was assumed the mammoths could not swim. When the Ice Age caused the sea levels to lower, the four northern Channel Islands formed a single island that was closer to the mainland and also larger in size. Pygmy mammoths are descendants of the Columbian mammoth. These were capable swimmers able to swim to the new island and adapt to the new environment.

The pygmy mammoths lived on Santa Rosae island which was beginning to shrink due to rising sea levels. The pygmy mammoths evolved through generations in order to survive on the ever-shrinking Santa Rosae Island. Smaller bodies require less food and resources to remain healthy in a smaller territory and allowed for less competition among the species, which is an example of island dwarfism. Also, their mainland predators such as the dire wolves, the Smilodon and the American lion were not present. After this evolutionary period, the mammoth had become a distinct species, the pygmy mammoth. The pygmy mammoth's evolution on Santa Rosae took over 30,000 years.

The pygmy mammoth is not the only example of island dwarfism in mammoth: another example is Mammuthus lamarmorai in the Mediterranean island of Sardinia.

Extinction

The cause of extinction of the pygmy mammoth is unknown, but it could have been caused by over-hunting by humans, wildfires, climate change, or some combination thereof.

Humans
Human interference often has a greater effect on island species than on continental species, and there is evidence that Native Americans hunted the pygmy mammoth on Santa Rosa. "Mammoths were still extant on the islands when humans arrived" and mammoth remains were associated with charcoal of the same radiocarbon date. Two mammoth skulls with the brain removed were found adjacent to a fire pit, of the 100 fire pits at least a third contained mammoth bones. "More complex ecological
explanations involving a combination of climate change and human predation are the most viable."

Wildfires
"Abrupt ecosystem disruption is evident on the Northern Channel Islands" with the onset of biomass burning and resulting mass sediment wasting of the landscape. "These wildfires coincide with the extinction of the pygmy mammoth."

Climate change
A shift in sea level driven by climate change likely played a part in the extinction: as the sea level rose, about 61% of the island land-mass was submerged. Further increase in sea levels left four smaller islands of nearly eighty percent less total landmass. Post-glacial warming reduced available fresh water and food sources for the pygmy mammoth, pressuring the remnant population and making it vulnerable to other adverse effects.

Comet impact

A controversial explanation of the pygmy mammoth's extinction is that of a cosmic impact affecting a large part of the western United States. However, geological data supporting such an impact is lacking.

See also

Dwarf elephant

Notes

References 

Agenbroad, L.D. (2001). "Channel Islands (USA) pygmy mammoths (Mammuthus exilis) compared and contrasted with M. columbi, their continental ancestral stock", World of Elephants, 473
Torben, Rick (2012). "Flightless ducks, giant mice and pygmy mammoths: Late Quaternary extinctions on California's Channel Islands", 3

Mammoths
Pleistocene proboscideans
Fauna of the Channel Islands of California
Pleistocene California
Mammoth Pygmy
Holocene extinctions
Mammoth Pygmy
Fossil taxa described in 1928
Pleistocene mammals of North America